The Mad Miss Manton is a 1938 American screwball comedy-mystery film directed by Leigh Jason and starring Barbara Stanwyck as fun-loving socialite Melsa Manton and Henry Fonda as newspaper editor Peter Ames. Melsa and her debutante friends hunt for a murderer while eating bonbons, flirting with Ames, and otherwise behaving like irresponsible socialites. Ames is also after the murderer, as well as Melsa's hand in marriage.

This was the first of three screen pairings for Stanwyck and Fonda, the others being The Lady Eve and You Belong to Me.

Plot
At 3:00 am, Melsa Manton takes her little dogs for a walk. Near a subway construction site, she sees Ronnie Belden run out of a house and drive away. The house is for sale by Sheila Lane, the wife of George Lane, a wealthy banker. Inside, Melsa finds a diamond brooch and George's dead body. As she runs for help, her cloak falls off with the brooch inside it. When the police arrive, the body, cloak, and brooch are gone. Melsa and her friends are notorious pranksters, so Lieutenant Mike Brent, does nothing to investigate the murder. Peter Ames writes an editorial decrying Melsa's "prank", and she sues him for libel.

Melsa and her friends decide they must find the murderer in order to defend their reputation. The resulting manhunt includes searches of the Lane house, Belden's apartment, Lane's business office, and all of the local beauty shops; two attempts to intimidate Melsa; two shooting attempts on her life: at a charity ball, and a trap set for the murderer using Melsa as bait. The women twice attack Ames and tie him up, although Melsa's friend Myra Frost enthusiastically flirts with him.

While Mike repeatedly accuses innocent people based on incorrect theories, Melsa deduces that Ronnie removed the body and cloak from the Lane house before the police arrived. An escaping would-be killer leaves behind a piece of tar paper, which reminds Melsa of the subway construction site. Returning to the site, she finds a fast electric cart on the track. This is how Edward Norris  made his way to and from the crime scene in ten minutes. Edward is captured after confessing to the murders and briefly holding Melsa and Peter hostage at gunpoint.

During the film, the relationship between Melsa and Peter evolves from sharp animosity to love and engagement. He almost immediately decides that he is going to marry her and begins to woo her aggressively. After the police rescue them from Edward, Melsa and Peter plan their honeymoon.

Cast
 Barbara Stanwyck as Melsa Manton, a wealthy socialite who has organized a pranking club with her friends 
 Henry Fonda as Peter Ames, editor of The Morning Clarion
 Sam Levene as Lieutenant Mike Brent, a bumbling police detective
 Frances Mercer as Helen Frayne, Melsa's sensible friend
 Stanley Ridges as Edward Norris, a convicted murderer
 Whitney Bourne as Pat James, Melsa's food-loving friend
 Vicki Lester as Kit Beverly, one of Melsa's friends
 Ann Evers as Lee Wilson, one of Melsa's friends
 Linda Perry as Myra Frost (as Linda Terry), Melsa's flirtatious friend
 Hattie McDaniel as Hilda (as Hattie McDaniels), Melsa's grumpy housekeeper
 James Burke as Sullivan, Brent's assistant
 Paul Guilfoyle as Bat Regan, owner of a gambling house 
 Penny Singleton as Frances Glesk 
 Leona Maricle as Sheila Lane 
 Kay Sutton as Gloria Hmilton 
 Miles Mander as Mr. Thomas
 Grady Sutton as D.A.'s Secretary
 John Qualen as Subway Watchman 
 Olin Howland as Mr X 
 George Chandler as Newspaper Man (uncredited) 
 Byron Foulger as Assistant Editor (uncredited)

Reception
The film made a profit of $88,000.

References

External links
 
 
 
 

1938 films
1938 romantic comedy films
1930s screwball comedy films
American crime comedy films
American romantic comedy films
American screwball comedy films
American black-and-white films
1930s comedy mystery films
Films scored by Roy Webb
Films directed by Leigh Jason
Films set in New York City
RKO Pictures films
American comedy mystery films
1930s crime comedy films
1930s American films